Pseudofungi is a grouping of heterokonts, also known as the Heterokontimycotina. It consists of the Oomycota and Hyphochytridiomycetes. Although numerous biochemical, ultrastructural, and genetic traits clearly place them in the heterokonts, their growth form (featuring hyphae) and mode of nutrition (osmotrophy) resemble that of fungi (which are not closely related).

Origin and ancestors 

It is believed that pseudofungi descend from unicellular algae among the Stramenopiles which lost their plastids. While evidence of these plastids hasn't been found, what has been proven is the existence of endosymbiotic red algae plastids. From this, a unicellular heterotroph proto-pseudofungi (probably a mushroom parasite) got its fungal genes through horizontal gene transfer, which would have led to the development of convergent fungal multicellularity, explaining why the cell wall is sometimes made of both chitin and cellulose. The group's interrelationships are as follows:

References

 
SAR supergroup unranked clades